Andrea Dunbar (22 May 1961 – 20 December 1990) was an English playwright. She wrote The Arbor (1980) and Rita, Sue and Bob Too (1982), an autobiographical drama about the sexual adventures of teenage girls living in a run-down part of Bradford, West Yorkshire. She wrote most of the adaptation for the film Rita, Sue and Bob Too (1987).

Early life
Dunbar was raised on Brafferton Arbor on the Buttershaw council estate in Bradford with seven brothers and sisters. Both her parents had worked in the textile industry. Dunbar attended Buttershaw Comprehensive School.

Career
Dunbar began her first play, The Arbor, in 1977 at the age of 15, writing it as a classroom assignment for CSE English. It is the story of "a Bradford schoolgirl who falls pregnant to her Pakistani boyfriend on a racist estate," and has an abusive drunken father. Encouraged by her teacher, she was helped to develop the play to performance standard. It received its première in 1980 at London's Royal Court Theatre, directed by Max Stafford-Clark. At the age of 18, Dunbar was the youngest playwright to have her work performed there. Alongside a play entered by Lucy Anderson Jones, The Arbor jointly won at the Young Writers' Festival, and was later augmented and performed in New York City. On 26 March 1980, she was featured in the BBC's Arena arts documentary series.

Dunbar was quickly commissioned to write a follow-up play, Rita, Sue and Bob Too, first performed in 1982. This explores similar themes to The Arbor through the lives of two teenage girls who are having affairs with the same married man. Dunbar's third and final play, Shirley (1986), places greater emphasis on a central character. It depicts a girl's "tumultuous relationship" with her mother. As she explained, she meant to write "about Shirley and John but, you know, I wrote the mother in and she bloody took over the whole play."

The film version of Rita, Sue and Bob Too (1987) was adapted for the cinema by Dunbar, directed by Alan Clarke and filmed on the Buttershaw estate. Dunbar disowned the film when more writers were brought in to give it a happier ending. However, it created considerable controversy on the estate because of its negative portrayal of the area. Dunbar was threatened by several residents, but nevertheless continued to live there.

In 2010 a commemorative blue plaque on Dunbar's former home on Brafferton Arbor was unveiled in the presence of her relatives.

Personal life
Dunbar first became pregnant at the age of 15; the baby was stillborn at six months. She later had three children by three different fathers. The first, Lorraine, was born in 1979, and had a Pakistani father. A year later, in 1980, Lisa was born, again while Dunbar was still a teenager. About three years later, she had a son, Andrew, with Jim Wheeler.

As a single mother, Dunbar lived in a Women's Aid refuge in Keighley and became an increasingly heavy drinker. In 1990 she died of a brain haemorrhage in Bradford Royal Infirmary at the age of 29, after falling ill in The Beacon, a pub on the Buttershaw Estate, at the junction of Reevy Road West and The Crescent. It was closed in 2016 and demolished in 2019, but appears in the opening shot of Rita, Sue and Bob Too. Her cremated remains were buried at Scholemoor Cemetery and Crematorium (Section N, Grave 1219) in Bradford. Her headstone is a small black granite cross.

In 2007, her eldest daughter Lorraine, a heroin addict at the time, was convicted of manslaughter for causing the death of her child by gross neglect after the child ingested a lethal dose of methadone.

In January 2018, her daughter Lisa Pearce died of stomach cancer after having been diagnosed in December 2016.

Depictions
In 2000, Dunbar's life and her surroundings were revisited in the play A State Affair by Robin Soans.

A film about her life, The Arbor, directed by Clio Barnard, was released in 2010. The film uses actors lip-synching to interviews with Dunbar and her family, and concentrates on the strained relationship between Dunbar and her daughter Lorraine.

A novel inspired by Dunbar's life and work, Black Teeth and a Brilliant Smile by Adelle Stripe, was published in 2017 by Wrecking Ball Press. It was shortlisted for the Portico Prize for Literature and the Gordon Burn Prize. A second edition came from Fleet Publishing in the same year. In 2019 a stage adaptation by Freedom Studios and screenwriter Lisa Holdsworth was announced in The Guardian. Dramatisation of Stripe's novel focused on women's relationships, with a cast of five sharing the roles. It portrayed a teenage Dunbar rising to national note with her autobiographical works The Arbor and Rita, Sue and Bob Too, and the challenges of life on the Buttershaw estate in Bradford.

A 2019 Woolyback production for BBC Radio 4 written and directed by Sean Grundy – Rita, Sue and Andrea Too – dramatized the life and career of Dunbar, played by Natalie Gavin.

References

External links

1961 births
1990 deaths
Writers from Bradford
20th-century British dramatists and playwrights